Darlington is a village in central Gentry County, Missouri, United States. The population was 66 at the 2020 census.

History
Darlington was laid out in 1879, and named after a railroad employee. A post office has been in operation at Darlington since 1879.

Geography
Darlington is located on the south edge of the Grand River floodplain. Albany lies approximately four miles to the northeast.

Demographics

2010 census
As of the census of 2010, there were 121 people, 44 households, and 34 families residing in the village. The racial makeup of the village was 92.6% White, 0.8% Native American, and 6.6% from two or more races.

There were 44 households, of which 40.9% had children under the age of 18 living with them, 59.1% were married couples living together, 18.2% had a female householder with no husband present, and 22.7% were non-families. 20.5% of all households were made up of individuals, and 13.7% had someone living alone who was 65 years of age or older. The average household size was 2.75 and the average family size was 3.15.

The median age in the village was 36.3 years. 29.8% of residents were under the age of 18; 10% were between the ages of 18 and 24; 19.8% were from 25 to 44; 21.6% were from 45 to 64; and 19% were 65 years of age or older. The gender makeup of the village was 43.8% male and 56.2% female.

2000 census
As of the census of 2000, there were 113 people, 41 households, and 30 families residing in the city. The population density was 275.7 people per square mile (106.4/km2). There were 55 housing units at an average density of 134.2 per square mile (51.8/km2). The racial makeup of the city was 100.00% White. Hispanic or Latino of any race were 4.42% of the population.

There were 41 households, out of which 41.5% had children under the age of 18 living with them, 58.5% were married couples living together, 14.6% had a female householder with no husband present, and 26.8% were non-families. 26.8% of all households were made up of individuals, and 7.3% had someone living alone who was 65 years of age or older. The average household size was 2.76 and the average family size was 3.33.

In the city the population was spread out, with 36.3% under the age of 18, 8.8% from 18 to 24, 23.9% from 25 to 44, 19.5% from 45 to 64, and 11.5% who were 65 years of age or older. The median age was 33 years. For every 100 females, there were 88.3 males. For every 100 females age 18 and over, there were 84.6 males.

The median income for a household in the city was $31,250, and the median income for a family was $32,250. Males had a median income of $26,563 versus $15,208 for females. The per capita income for the village was $9,586. There were 12.9% of families and 18.2% of the population living below the poverty line, including 29.7% of under eighteens and none of those over 64.

References

Cities in Gentry County, Missouri
Cities in Missouri